Andre Holmes (born June 16, 1988) is a former American football wide receiver. Originally signed by the Dallas Cowboys as an undrafted free agent in 2011, Holmes also played for the Oakland Raiders, Buffalo Bills, and Denver Broncos.

Holmes played college football at Hillsdale College. He played for Hillsdale from 2007 to 2010 and holds the school's all-time record for receiving yardage.  During his junior and senior seasons, he also set multiple Hillsdale records with 181 catches, 2,444 yards and 17 touchdowns. After completing his collegiate career, he was invited to play in the Texas vs. The Nation college football all-star game.

Early years
Holmes attended James B. Conant High School where he started at wide receiver for only one season.  His football coaches were Dave Pendergast and Bill Modelski.  He also participated in basketball where he was coached by Tom McCormack and Jeff Stewart. 

In track and field, he set PR of 6.85 meters in the long jump and 14.06 meters in triple jump. In addition, he was also a member of the 4 × 200m relay (1:29.66).

College career
Holmes accepted a football scholarship from NCAA Division II Hillsdale College, where he was coached by Keith Otterbein. As a sophomore, he became a starter at wide receiver. As a junior, he started all 12 games, posting 77 receptions for 1,076 yards.

As a senior, he set single-season school records with 104 receptions and over 1,300 receiving yards. He also had 11 touchdowns. He set a single-game school record in the team's first-round playoff game against St. Cloud State University with 16 receptions, while tallying 208 yards and 2 touchdowns.

Holmes finished his college career as the school's All-time receiver with 219 receptions for 3,092 yards. He was twice named ALL-GLIAC and a Division II All-American honorable-mention. 

He was also a member of the track and field team, winning the GLIAC title in the outdoor triple jump at the conference championships in 2006.

Professional career

Dallas Cowboys
Holmes was signed as an undrafted free agent by the Dallas Cowboys after the 2011 NFL Draft on July 27, due to his small school background. He was waived on August 29.

Dallas Cowboys
On September 5, 2011, the Dallas Cowboys signed him to their practice squad. He was promoted him to the active roster on December 9. He suffered a hamstring injury and did not play in the last 4 games of the season. Holmes was waived by the Cowboys on November 24, 2012. On November 27, the Cowboys signed Holmes to their practice squad, as a replacement to Danny Coale, but he wasn't re-signed at the end of the season.

New England Patriots
Holmes was signed by New England Patriots on January 8, 2013, to the practice squad. He was waived on May 10.

Oakland Raiders
Holmes was claimed off waivers by the Oakland Raiders on May 13, 2013. On July 27, 2013, he was suspended for the first 4 games of the 2013 season due to violating the league's performance-enhancing drugs policy. After serving his suspension and being reinstated by the NFL the Raiders activated him to their roster on October 7, 2013, filling the open roster spot after the release of quarterback Matt Flynn.

On January 7, 2017, Holmes caught his first career postseason touchdown from quarterback Connor Cook in the Raiders' 14–27 wildcard round loss to the Houston Texans.

Buffalo Bills
On March 18, 2017, Holmes signed a three-year, $6.5 million contract with the Buffalo Bills. On September 10, in the season-opening 21–12 victory over the New York Jets, he recorded his first touchdown as a Bill, a one-yard pass from quarterback Tyrod Taylor. He was placed on injured reserve on December 26, 2017 with a neck injury.

During the 2018 season, Holmes played in over 70% of special team snaps for the Bills. On December 4, 2018, the Bills released Holmes.

Denver Broncos
On December 5, 2018, Holmes was claimed off waivers by the Denver Broncos. On December 28, 2018, Holmes was placed on injured reserve. He was released on January 23, 2019.

NFL career statistics

Regular season

Postseason

Personal life
Holmes' father, Kevin Holmes, played college basketball for DePaul in the 1980s. His younger brother Jason, a former college basketball player at Mississippi Valley State and Morehead State, played Australian rules football professionally with St Kilda in the Australian Football League.

References

External links

Dallas Cowboys bio
Hillsdale Chargers bio

1988 births
Living people
American football wide receivers
Buffalo Bills players
Denver Broncos players
Dallas Cowboys players
Hillsdale Chargers football players
Hillsdale Chargers men's track and field athletes
James B. Conant High School alumni
Minnesota Vikings players
New England Patriots players
Oakland Raiders players
People from Hoffman Estates, Illinois
Players of American football from Illinois
Sportspeople from Cook County, Illinois
Sportspeople from Kane County, Illinois